This list of electronic Floras is arranged by country within continent. An electronic Flora is an online resource which provides descriptions of the associated plants, often also providing  identification keys, or partial identification keys, to the plants described. Some Floras point to the literature associated with the plants of the region (flora Malesiana), others seek to show the plants of a region using images (flora of India), others give an inventory of the region's plants (flora of Pakistan).

Countries with sites listing both flora and fauna have also been included, since the sites provide a useful resource for those seeking to use a Flora.

World (families/genera)
Wattles Worldwide Wattle.
 Pl@ntNet – plant database, species identifications, observations, photograph, citizen science project

Africa
Base de données des plantes d'Afrique. CJB Conservatoire et Jardin botaniques de la Ville de Genève.

Botswana
Flora of Botswana

Egypt 
Common Plants of Western Desert of Egypt

Eswatini 
Eswatini's Flora Database Eswatini National Trust Commission

Malawi
Flora of Malawi

Morocco 
Flore du Maroc (only Pteridophytes, Gymnosperms and families from Acanthaceae to Asteraceae)
Plant biodiversity of South-Western Morocco

Mozambique
Flora of Mozambique

Namibia
Flora of Caprivi (Namibia)

South Africa
PlantZAfrica.com: Plants of South Africa

Zambia
Flora of Zambia

Zimbabwe
Flora of Zimbabwe

Asia

China
Flora of China
Moss Flora of China

Cyprus 
Flora of Cyprus

India
eflora of India
E-Flora of Kerala

Iran 
Flora of Iran

Japan
Database of Japanese Flora

Nepal
Annotated checklist of the flowering plants of Nepal

Pakistan
 Flora of Pakistan

Europe

France
INPN Inventaire National du Patrimoine Naturel (France and overseas territories - fauna and flora)

Greece 
Cretan Flora
Greek Flora
Vascular Plants Checklist of Greece (checklist, photo and distribution atlas)

Italy 
Acta Plantarum - Flora delle Regioni italiane
Flora Italiana
Portal to the Flora of Italy

Portugal 
Flora.on

United Kingdom
Atlas of the British and Irish flora
Flora of Northern Ireland

North America

United States
 Jepson eflora:The Jepson Herbarium University of California, Berkeley
 Illinois Plants
 New York Flora Atlas, New York Flora Association
 Flora of Missouri
 Flora of North Dakota checklist
 Flora of North America. Tropicos
 Online Virtual Flora of Wisconsin

Nicaragua 
 Flora de Nicaragua

Oceania

Australia
 Flora of Australia online or FoAO (in wikidata) Note: No longer maintained and search function does not work, although manual browsing is possible from this page 
 Flora of Australia (current site) or FoAO2 (in wikidata)
 PlantNet: New South Wales Flora online, National Herbarium of New South Wales, Royal Botanic Gardens Sydney.
eFlora: Vascular Plants of the Sydney Region - The University of Sydney
 FloraNT: Northern Territory flora online, Northern Territory Government
 VicFlora: Flora of Victoria, Royal Botanic Gardens Foundation Victoria
 eFloraSA: Electronic Flora of South Australia, Government of South Australia
 Flora of Tasmania online:  an eFlora for the State of Tasmania
 FloraBase: The Western Australian Flora. Western Australian Herbarium, Biodiversity and Conservation Science, Department of Biodiversity, Conservation and Attractions.

 Australian Tropical Rainforest Plants (WP article)

Philippines
 Co's Digital Flora of the Philippines

Malesiana
FLORA MALESIANA Naming, Describing And Inventorying The Flora Of Malesia

New Caledonia
 Faune et Flore de la Nouvelle Caledonie

New Guinea
 Plants of Papua New Guinea

New Zealand
 NZ Flora: The definitive reference to New Zealand plants

South America

Chile
Flora of Chile
ChileFlora Your window to the world of Chilean plants

Ecuador
Trees and shrubs of the Andes of Ecuador

Brazil
Flora do Brasil 2020 Algae, Fungi, Plants (This resource is close in concept to the Australasian Virtual Herbarium: with collections data available for download, but searches on specific names reveal full descriptions)
 CNCFlora (Centro Nacional de Conservação da Flora). This is a national resource for generating, coordinating and disseminating information on biodiversity and conservation of endangered Brazilian flora. Produces a Red List based on IUCN criteria and categories.

Botany